Andrew T. Guzman is the dean of USC Gould School of Law. Formerly, he was the Jackson H. Ralston Professor of Law and Associate Dean at UC Berkeley School of Law, where he is also the Director of the Advanced Law Degree Programs, and Associate Dean for International and Advanced Degree Programs.

He holds a B.Sc. from the University of Toronto (1990), a J.D. from Harvard Law School (1996), a Ph.D. in economics, also from Harvard, also in 1996.  He is a member of the Academic Council of the Institute for Transnational Arbitration. Among other publications, he is the author of Overheated, How International Law Works, and International Trade Law

Research and teaching 
Guzman is a specialist in international trade, international regulatory matters, foreign direct investment, and public international law. He teaches foreign investment law, international law and international relations, international trade, and contracts.

Selected publications

Books
 Andrew T. Guzman, Overheated: The Human Cost of Climate Change, Oxford University Press, 2013
 Andrew T. Guzman & Joost Pauwelyn, International Trade Law, Aspen Publishers, 2012
 Andrew T. Guzman & Joost Pauwelyn, International Trade Law: Document Supplement to the Second Edition, Aspen Publishers, 2012
 Andrew T. Guzman, Cooperation, Comity, and Competition Policy, Oxford University Press, 2010
 Andrew T. Guzman, How International Law Works,  Oxford University Press, 2008
 Andrew T. Guzman & Alan O. Sykes, Research Handbook in International Economic Law, Elgar Publishing, 2007

Articles
 Andrew T. Guzman, The Law and Economics of Soft Law, Handbook on the Economic of Public International Law, (2012)
 Andrew T. Guzman, Against Consent, Virginia Journal of International Law, (2012)
 Andrew T. Guzman, Climate Change and U.S. Interests: Reply to Responses, Environmental Law and Policy Annual Review, (2011)
 Andrew T. Guzman, A Strategy for Cooperation in Global Competition Policy, in Regulation and Competition in the Global Economy: Cooperation, Comity, and Competition Policy, (2012)
 Andrew T. Guzman & Timothy L. Meyer, International Soft Law, Journal of Legal Analysis, (2010)
 Andrew T. Guzman & Joly Freeman, Climate Change and U.S. Interests, Columbia Law Review, (2009)

References

External links
 Website of Andrew T. Guzman at USC Gould School of Law
 Personal Website of Andrew T. Guzman

Living people
UC Berkeley School of Law faculty
University of Toronto alumni
Harvard Law School alumni
Deans of law schools in the United States
Year of birth missing (living people)